Juan Flores may refer to:

Academics
 Juan de Flores (c. 1455–c. 1525), Spanish courtier, diplomat and author
 Juan Flores (professor) (1943–2014), American professor of social and cultural analysis

Politics
 Juan José Flores (1800–1864), Venezuelan president and military general
 Juan Alcocer Flores (born 1955), Mexican politician
 Juan Gerardo Flores Ramírez (born 1968), Mexican politician

Sportspeople
 Juan Flores (1930s footballer), Peruvian football forward
 Juan Flores (wrestler) (born 1940), Mexican Olympic wrestler
 Juan Flores (footballer, born 1964), Honduran football forward
 Juan Flores (footballer, born 1976), Peruvian goalkeeper
 Juan Flores (footballer, born 1993), Mexican football winger
 Juan Flores (American soccer) (born 1997), American soccer forward

Other
 Juan Flores (outlaw) (c. 1834–1857), Californio bandit
 Juan Carlos Flores (1962–2016), Cuban poet